The 1828 United States presidential election in Kentucky took place between October 31 and December 2, 1828, as part of the 1828 United States presidential election. Voters chose 14 representatives, or electors to the Electoral College, who voted for President and Vice President.

Kentucky voted for the Democratic candidate, Andrew Jackson, over the National Republican candidate, John Quincy Adams. Jackson won Kentucky by a margin of 11.08%.

This would be the only time Democrats would win Kentucky until 1856, after the Whig Party had collapsed.

Results

References

Kentucky
1828
1828 Kentucky elections